Rivadavia may refer to:

Places

Argentina

Populated places
 Comodoro Rivadavia (Chubut)
 Rivadavia, Salta (Salta)
 Rivadavia, San Juan (San Juan)
 Rivadavia, Mendoza (Mendoza)

Departments
 Rivadavia Department (disambiguation)

other
 Rivadavia Avenue (one of Buenos Aires' most important thoroughfares)
  (Argentina's first and only class of dreadnought battleship)
 , the first of its class, at the time of its 1911 launch, the world's largest battleship
 Lake Rivadavia, in Los Alerces National Park
 Club Rivadavia, Argentine football club from Lincoln, Buenos Aires

People
 Bernardino Rivadavia (the first president of Argentina)